Mohamed Wali Akeik (born 1950) is a Sahrawi politician who was the prime minister of the Sahrawi Arab Democratic Republic, which holds a disputed claim over Western Sahara. Akeik was appointed on 4 February 2018 by President Brahim Ghali, succeeding Abdelkader Taleb Omar, who had been serving as Prime Minister since late 2003.

Wali Akeik was born in 1950 in El Aaiún, the capital of the territory then called Spanish Sahara.

Personal life 
Wali Akeik is married and has eight children.

References

1950 births
Living people
Prime Ministers of the Sahrawi Arab Democratic Republic
People from Laayoune
Polisario Front politicians